Figure skating is one of the sports featured at the Winter Youth Olympics. It includes the disciplines of men's singles, ladies' singles, pair skating, and ice dancing. The sport was part of the inaugural Winter Youth Olympics, held in January 2012 in Innsbruck, Austria.

Medalists

Men

Ladies

Pairs

Ice dance

Medal table
As of the 2020 Winter Youth Olympics.

Mixed NOC team medalists
Teams made up of athletes representing different National Olympic Committees (NOCs), called mixed-NOCs teams, participate in the Winter Youth Olympics. These teams participate in events composed entirely of mixed-NOCs teams. The first edition did not include pairs due to the low number of entries.

See also
Figure skating at the Olympic Games

References

External links 
 International Skating Union
 Youth Olympic Games

Winter Youth Olympics
 
Youth Olympic Games
Sports at the Winter Youth Olympics